The Berg River Dam is a  high dam on the Berg River in South Africa. It is the centerpiece of the Berg Water Project (BWP) which is designed to capture the winter rainfall and store it for supply to Cape Town during the dry summer months. The project in turn forms an important part of the Western Cape Water Supply System (WCWSS), an intricate system of dams and bulk water infrastructure that provides water to more than 3 million people. At the inauguration of the dam in 2009, then President of South Africa Kgalema Motlanthe called the project "a good example of how public infrastructure projects can be used to contribute meaningfully to poverty eradication and to foster social empowerment of the people." The Berg River Dam was the first dam in South Africa to be designed and constructed, and is due to be operated, in accordance with the guidelines of the World Commission on Dams. It has been completed on time and within budget. The Berg River basin and the adjacent metropolitan area of Cape Town are of particular importance to the Western Cape region because, although the basin generates only about 3% of the country's water resources, it is home to about 8% of South Africa's population, and produces about 12% of GDP.

The Berg River Dam (Autshumato Dam) was completed in 2007 at cost of R1,5 billion. It was designed and built in accordance with the United Nations World Commission on Dams, to provide water for Cape Town.

Planning and construction
Planning for the Berg river dam began in 1989 by the South African Department of Water Affairs and Forestry. The process started with an analysis of future needs and water resources in the region, and was subjected to rigorous public participation process and debate. In 1995/6 a comprehensive "Evaluation of Options" study was undertaken, a process in which more than 1,100 individuals and organisations took part. Extensive environmental and social impact studies were undertaken during 1996 and 1997 The Department of Environmental Affairs and Tourism approved the project in 1999. In April 2002, the Cabinet approved the construction of the dam on condition that the City of Cape Town reduces the demand for water by 20% by 2020. Construction began in July 2004. The dam started storing water in July 2007 and was full a year later thanks to good rainfall. According to the South African government, the decision to build the dam was taken only after an extensive review of the alternative options. It also involved an intensive public consultation process.

Benefits

The scheme will also improve the reliability of water supplies in the drought-prone river basin. It is also expected that it will contribute to improve the naturally poor water quality in the lower reaches of the river.

Environmental impact and its mitigation
The Berg River Dam was the first dam in South Africa to be designed, constructed and operated in accordance with the guidelines of the World Commission on Dams. According to the South African government this was confirmed by a 2001 a review of the project's processes. This is despite the fact that its planning phase preceded the World Commission on Dams, which was formed in 1997 and presented its report in 2000. The experience under the Berg River Dam thus influenced the work of the commission, not vice versa.

Indigenous plants have been planted on the downstream face of the dam wall, ensuring that the dam blends with the surrounding landscape. Parallel to the dam's construction alien vegetation was removed from the upper river catchment, significantly increasing the amount of water available for storage and for indigenous plant species. The scheme was designed to maintain the ecological integrity of the river, including through the release of specific volumes of water for this purpose. The releases of low flows and high flows coincide as closely as possible with natural flows. The outlet works of the dam have been designed for a peak release of up to 200 m³ per second, making it the first dam in South Africa where provision is made for flood releases for environmental purposes.

An Environmental Management Plan (EMP) has been drawn up, on the basis of which an independent Environmental Control Officer (ECO) monitored and audited compliance by the dam's owner, the Trans-Caledon Tunnel Authority (TCTA), and all contractors. Achievements were documented in monthly reports and 6-monthly audits. Compliance was 82% in the first audit and 96% in the second audit. According to the project company, the independent ECO stated that there are no observable significant negative impacts associated with the project.
Furthermore, a community-based and representative Environmental Monitoring Committee (EMC) has been created to ensure effective environmental management of the project.

Cape Town implemented a water conservation strategy aimed at reducing the use of water by using treated sewage effluent instead of fresh water for irrigation and industrial purposes. As a result of this strategy, and because people have become more aware of the value of water and are trying harder to conserve it, the council is experiencing a 25% saving.

Adapting to climate change
On the basis of a dynamic spatial equilibrium model for the Berg River, it has been estimated that the net present value of economic activities in the basin could be reduced by 11.5%. Without the Berg dam it would have been reduced by about 15%.

Cost and financing
The Berg Water Project was initially estimated at R1,877m, which was reduced to R1,552 million (2006 estimate) after changes to the design of the dam. The Berg Water Project has been financed by loans from the Development Bank of Southern Africa (DBSA) (R500 million), the European Investment Bank (EIB) (R800 million) and Absa Group Limited (R300 million). In 2004 Fitch Ratings awarded the highest credit rating for a project of this kind, AA+. Debt was contracted by the TCTA.–

Cost recovery is through the sale of bulk water from TCTA to the Department of Water and Forestry, a government Ministry, which in turn sells the bulk water to the city of Cape Town. This arrangement reduces the financial risk, since the national government has a better credit rating than the city of Cape Town. The Western Cape population contributed towards the project in the form of an annual increase in water tariffs of 2.5% between 1999 and 2009.

Technical characteristics

Downstream of the dam a "supplement scheme" diverts winter high flow, entering the Berg River from the Franschhoek, Wemmershoek and the Dwars River tributaries, to supplement water stored in the dam. Water from the scheme is pumped via the Drakenstein pump station, along a  pipeline, back up to the Berg River Dam.

Awards
The Berg Water Project has received the following awards:
 the Consulting Engineers South Africa's Glenrand MIB Award for Engineering Excellence
 the International Association for Environmental Impact Assessment South Africa's Award for Excellence in Environmental Management in Project Execution
 the South African Institute of Civil Engineering Technical Excellence Award
 Construction World Best Project 2008 public/private partnership.

See also
 List of reservoirs and dams in South Africa

References

External links
Weekly storage volume of dams in the Western Cape Province
Water Institute of Southern Africa:Dams in South Africa:Western Cape

Dams in South Africa
Dams completed in 2009
21st-century architecture in South Africa